The name Tapah has been used to name four tropical cyclones in the northwestern Pacific Ocean. The name was submitted by Malaysia and refers to a species of huge freshwater catfish, called Wallago attu.
 Tropical Storm Tapah (2002) (T0201, 01W, Agaton)
 Tropical Storm Tapah (2007) (T0722, 22W)
 Severe Tropical Storm Tapah (2014) (T1405, 06W)
Typhoon Tapah (2019) (T1917, 18W, Nimfa) – A storm that caused widespread rains and flooding in the Philippines.

Pacific typhoon set index articles